The White Caps Turnhout are an ice hockey team in Turnhout, Belgium. The White Caps play in the Belgian Hockey League and North Sea Cup. They play their home games in Kempisch Ijsstadion. They participate in the Belgian Cup tournament and the Belgian Elite League.

History
The club was founded in 1981, and won their first Belgian Hockey League title in 2004. They then won their first Belgian Cup in 2006, and repeated their success by winning it in 2007, 2008, and 2009. They also won the Belgian Championship in 2007, 2008, and 2011.  They participated in ten games of the 2011-2012 season of the North Sea Cup before dropping out due to a lack of available players and their game results were annulled.  The team returned to the all-Belgian Elite League for 2012-2013.

Season Results
Note: GP = Games played, W = Wins, OTW = Overtime Wins, OTL = Overtime Losses, L = Losses, GF = Goals for, GA = Goals against, Pts = Points

Achievements
Belgian champion (4): 2006, 2007, 2008, 2011
Belgian Cup champion (4): 2004, 2007, 2008, 2009

IIHF Continental Cup
2012 Round 1 Continental Cup. Hosted in Ankara, Turkey.

 HC Metulla withdrew from tournament in July, 2011

References

External links
Club profile on hockeyarenas.net

Ice hockey teams in Belgium
Ice hockey clubs established in 1981
1981 establishments in Belgium
Sport in Turnhout